Sivananthi Thanenthiran is a Malaysian writer and feminist, who is the executive director of ARROW, the Asian-Pacific Resource and Research Centre for Women.

Life 
Thanenthiran started her political work by promoting female candidates in political elections. In her professional life, she worked for the United Nations, taught at the university, and ran a magazine. She also co-wrote and edited books on Agenda 21, such as Cities, Chaos & Creativity: A Sourcebook for Communicators, Cities, Citizens & Civilisations: Frequently Asked Questions on Good Urban Governance and Agenda for Action: Action for Better Cities. While making research for a book on sexual and reproductive health and rights, she discovered the lack of knowledge on the topic in Malaysia, and joined the Malaysia-based NGO ARROW, the Asian-Pacific Resource and Research Centre for Women, for which she eventually became the Executive Director. In this regard, she gave a statement to the United Nations General Assembly in March 2015.

The research center works in the form of a regional partnership between 15 countries in Asia-Pacific, and with organizations and networks in these countries and across the global south. Its focus is on women and young people, with a specific focus on sexual and reproductive health and rights.

References 

Living people
Malaysian feminists
Malaysian women
Malaysian writers
Year of birth missing (living people)
Place of birth missing (living people)